Roscoe Sarles (4 January 1892  – 17 September 1922) was an American racecar driver active in the formative years of auto racing.

Biography
He was born on January 4, 1892, in New Albany, Indiana.

Sarles was burned to death on September 17, 1922, when his car crashed at the Kansas City Speedway.

Indianapolis 500 results

Finishing Positions in AAA championships.
1919 4th, 1920 5th, 1921 2nd, 1922 6th

References

1892 births
1922 deaths
AAA Championship Car drivers
Deaths from fire in the United States
Indianapolis 500 drivers
People from New Albany, Indiana
Racing drivers from Indiana
Racing drivers who died while racing
Sports deaths in Missouri